Rossvale Football Club are a Scottish football club originally from the town of Bishopbriggs, East Dunbartonshire but now based in North Glasgow who play in the West of Scotland Football League.

History
Originally formed in 1976 by John Grey as Woodhill Boys Club, they run youth football teams from under 5 to over 35 level.

The decision was taken in early 2010 to enter an adult team in the Junior football set up, with the aim of allowing ex-youth players to remain in the game at a decent standard. The club joined the Central District Second Division for the start of the 2011–12 season.

Rossvale clinched their first Junior honour in March 2015 by winning the 2014–15 Central District Second Division title. A notable player in their victorious squad was former Aberdeen and Scotland striker Robbie Winters. Three years later the club won the Central District First Division title, and then immediately gained promotion to the West Region Premiership the following season. In 2020, like all West Region clubs, Rossvale moved to the senior pyramid by joining the West of Scotland Football League.

The first team are based at Petershill in Glasgow, having initially been based at Huntershill, they moved into the enhanced facility for the 2017–18 season after initially groundsharing with Petershill. For the 2020–21 season, Rossvale 1st team will train at Petershill, but play matches there, having ended their stay at New Tinto Park in Govan, Glasgow, in a groundsharing agreement with Benburb. This is due to Huntershill's owners, East Dunbartonshire Council, being unwilling to invest in upgrading its facilities.

The team was managed from November 2017 to September 2019 by former Albion Rovers defender Gordon Moffat.
The management team of manager David Gormley and assistant manager Sean Higgins took over in September 2019 but left just before the new 21/22 season start.

As of February 2022, Rossvale FC announced new co-owner's, shareholder's and directors to their newly formed structure subject to SFA approval. Mark Tivey and Andrew Pritchard MSc, who currently co-own Europa Point F.C. who currently compete in the Gibraltar National League, will join Chairman Dom McInally in forming the new structure of Rossvale FC, subject to SFA approval. This new structure will be beneficial in providing new pathways into further European competition.

Managers
 Ian Gray (Jul 2010 – Nov 2013)
 Alan Jack (Nov 2013 – Apr 2014)
 Martin Lauchlan (May 2014 – Feb 2016)
 Brian McGinty (Mar 2016 – Oct 2017)
 Gordon Moffat (Nov 2017 – Sep 2019)
 David Gormley (Sep 2019 – Aug 2021)
 Bill Reside (Aug 2021 - Aug 2021) (Caretaker Manager)
 Iain Diack (Aug 2021 - Nov 2021)
 Jamie Sandilands (Nov 2021 - July 22)
 Alan Bateman + Alex Miller (Assistant Manager) - (July 2022 - August 2022)
 Kevin Kelly (Caretaker Coach) (August 2022 – Present)

Honours

Junior
West Region Central District First Division winners: 2017–18
West Region Central District Second Division winners: 2014–15

References

External links
 Club website
 
 

Football in East Dunbartonshire
Football clubs in Scotland
Scottish Junior Football Association clubs
Association football clubs established in 1976
Organisations based in East Dunbartonshire
1976 establishments in Scotland
Football clubs in Glasgow
Bishopbriggs
West of Scotland Football League teams